Sir Ralph Endersby Harwood  (28 March 1883 – 28 February 1951) was Financial Secretary to George V, Edward VIII and George VI.

Early life
Harwood was born on 28 March 1883, the son of Charles Harwood of Shefford, Bedfordshire.  He was educated at Bedford Modern School.

Career
Harwood served as Deputy Treasurer to George V from 1922 until 1935 and Financial Secretary to George V (1935), Edward VIII (1936) and George VI (1937).  He later became a Governor of the London School of Economics.

Family life

In 1903, Harwood married Kitty, the daughter of William Rule Endersby.  They had one son and three daughters.  Sir Ralph was instrumental in the restoration of Seckford Hall, a Suffolk mansion.

Harwood died on 28 February 1951 and is buried in the churchyard of St Leonard's church in Old Warden in Bedfordshire.

There is a photographic portrait of him at the National Portrait Gallery.

References

1883 births
People educated at Bedford Modern School
1951 deaths
Lord High Treasurers
Knights Commander of the Order of the Bath
Knights Commander of the Royal Victorian Order
Commanders of the Order of the British Empire
People from Shefford, Bedfordshire
Burials in Bedfordshire